The 1960–61 Scottish Second Division was won by Stirling Albion who, along with second placed Falkirk, were promoted to the First Division. Morton finished bottom.

Table

References 

 Scottish Football Archive

Scottish Division Two seasons
2
Scot